Lucky J (Hangul; 럭키제이; RR: leogkijei) was a South Korean hip-hop group formed by YMC Entertainment. The group's three original members were J'Kyun, Jessi, and J-Yo. The group debuted with their first single "Can You Hear Me?" in July 2014.

History

2014: Debut
On July 9, 2014, YMC Entertainment announced the creation of a new co-ed hip hop group. The members of the group were revealed to be rapper J'Kyun, vocalist and rapper Jessi, and vocalist J-Yo. On July 17, their first single, "Can You Hear Me?", was released through digital portals alongside the music video. On July 17, the group officially made their debut on Mnet's M! Countdown, where they performed their first single. The group later appeared in the first ever episode of Mnet's Singer Game, as well as the music competition program Immortal Songs 2.

2015: Hiatus and solo activities
After the release of their first single, each member focused on promoting individually and through collaborations. In February, J-Yo released a song with singer Eru called "Avenue". In July, J'Kyun released a single called "Bad X" featuring Jooheon from Monsta X and Konsoul. Jessi gained public attention after her appearance in the rap survival program Unpretty Rapstar, which ran from January through March. She then began to appear as a guest in many popular variety shows, including Running Man and Happy Together. Jessi also collaborated several well-known artists, notably Park Jin-young and Primary. Her first solo rap single "Ssenunni" was released in September, and she later performed the title song at the 2015 Mnet Asian Music Awards.

2016: Second single, J-yo's departure & disbandment
On December 2015, it was revealed that the group was working on an album with no exact release date. On January 8, 2016, the group released their second single titled "No Love", alongside the music video. On January 7, the group officially made their comeback on Mnet's M! Countdown, where they performed their second single. In August, J-Yo left the group to focus on his solo career under the new stage name Jero, and Jessi later announced that the group had disbanded.

Discography

Singles

References

South Korean hip hop groups
Musical groups established in 2014
2014 establishments in South Korea
2016 disestablishments in South Korea
Musical groups disestablished in 2016
South Korean co-ed groups